Carlton Dewey Everhart II (born June 17, 1961) is a retired United States Air Force general, who served as the commander of Air Mobility Command. He was previously Commander, Third Air Force and commanded Eighteenth Air Force. Everhart is a 1983 graduate of Virginia Tech and received his commission through Air Force ROTC. He is a command pilot with more than 4,500 flight hours. Everhart has served in varying aircrew assignments in the C-130E, C-17A and C-21A. Everhart retired effective November 1, 2018 after more than 35 years of active duty service.

Military career
Everhart's first assignment in February 1984 was as a student at Undergraduate Pilot Training at Columbus Air Force Base. Upon successful completion of pilot training, Everhart next reported to Little Rock Air Force Base to serve in the 50th Tactical Airlift Squadron. From 1985 to 1989, Everhart variously served as a pilot, instructor, aircraft commander, and as a special operations low level aircraft commander. In December 1989, Everhart joined the cadre of the 34th Combat Aircrew Training Squadron, also located at Little Rock AFB. He served as an instructor/evaluator and was the Chief, Joint Airlift Tactics. In November 1992, Everhart was selected for transition to the then new C-17 Globemaster III as a member of the initial training cadre with the 17th Airlift Squadron at Charleston Air Force Base. He later became Deputy and then Chief, Standardization and Evaluation for the 14th Airlift Squadron, also at Charleston AFB.
 
Starting in June 1996, Everhart began a series of assignments in the National Capital Region. He first served as a Mobility Force Planner in the Directorates of Forces and Requirements, Headquarters U.S. Air Force, followed by a stint as the Executive Officer, Directorate of Joint Matters, Headquarters U.S. Air Force. From March 1998 to March 2000, Everhart served as an Air Force Aide to the President. Everhart's first command came in June 2000, when he assumed command of the 457th Airlift Squadron at Andrews Air Force Base. His time in the National Capital Region concluded when he completed a master's degree at the National War College at Fort Lesley J. McNair in 2002.
 
In 2002, Everhart served for a year as the Chief, Joint Mobility Operations Center Team at U.S. Transportation Command, Scott Air Force Base. This assignment was followed by Group command of the 374th Operations Group from August 2003 to July 2005 at Yokota Air Base, Japan. During that assignment, Everhart deployed to Southwest Asia and was the Commander, 386th Expeditionary Wing from March to July 2004.

Returning to the United States in July 2005, Everhart became the Vice Commander, 97th Air Mobility Wing at Altus Air Force Base. He assumed command of the wing in September, serving as the commander until August 2007.

In August 2007, Everhart began his first assignment with Air Education and Training Command (AETC) as the Inspector General, Headquarters Air Education and Training Command at Randolph Air Force Base. In June 2008, he became the Deputy Director of Intelligence, Operations and Nuclear Integration for Flying Training at HQ AETC.

General officer assignments
Everhart's first assignment after being promoted to flag rank was as Deputy Commander, Political-Military Affairs, Combined Security Transition Command-Afghanistan in Kabul, Afghanistan, from March 2009 to April 2010. Returning to Scott Air Force Base in June 2010, Everhart was Vice Commander, 618th Air and Space Operations Center (Tanker Airlift Control Center). He became the 618th's commander in July 2011, serving in that capacity until April 2012.

Everhart became the Vice Commander, 3rd Air Force (3AF)at Ramstein Air Base, Germany in April 2012. He was dual hatted as the Commander, U.S. Air Forces Africa from May 2012 to July 2012. While serving as Vice Commander, 3AF, the commander Craig A. Franklin became embroiled in a scandal concerning his overturning of the conviction of an Air Force officer for sexual assault. Franklin retired early, at a reduced rank, so that his command and the Air Force could be spared further scrutiny for his actions. He relinquished command on 31 January 2014. This left Everhart to become Commander, 3rd Air Force on 1 February 2014, serving until June 2014.

On 11 August 2015, General Everhart assumed command of Air Mobility Command at Scott Air Force Base, Illinois.  He retired from the Air Force on November 1, 2018.

Education
Everhart was commissioned through Air Force ROTC upon his completion of a Bachelor of Science degree in Agriculture at Virginia Tech. He earned a Master of Science degree in business management from the University of Arkansas in 1989. Everhart earned a Master of Science degree in National Security Strategy from the National War College in 2002. Everhart has attended both the Capstone and Pinnacle Courses at the National Defense University.

Everhart is a graduate of numerous Professional Military Education programs. He has graduated from the following: Squadron Officer School in 1989, Air Command and Staff College in 1995, Army Command and General Staff College in 1996, and Air War College in 2001.

Awards and decorations
Everhart has been awarded the following awards and decorations:

Effective dates of promotion
Second Lieutenant: Oct. 11, 1983 
First Lieutenant: Oct. 11, 1985 
Captain: Oct. 11, 1987 
Major: Nov. 1, 1994 
Lieutenant Colonel: July 1, 1999 
Colonel: Aug. 1, 2003 
Brigadier General: Jan. 31, 2009
Major General: July 20, 2012
Lieutenant General: June 20, 2014
General: Aug. 11, 2015

References

|-

|-

1961 births
United States Air Force personnel of the Gulf War
United States Air Force personnel of the War in Afghanistan (2001–2021)
Recipients of the Air Force Distinguished Service Medal
Recipients of the Air Medal
Recipients of the Defense Superior Service Medal
Recipients of the Legion of Merit
United States Air Force officers
Virginia Tech alumni
Living people